Eupithecia anemica is a moth in the family Geometridae. It is found in the mountains of southern Kazakhstan, Uzbekistan, Kirghizstan, Tajikistan and Pakistan.

References

Moths described in 1988
anemica
Moths of Asia